Joel Grodowski (born 30 November 1997) is a German professional footballer who plays as a striker for  club SC Verl.

Career
After playing youth football with FC Schalke 04 and Rot Weiss Ahlen, Grodowski began his senior career with PSV Bork in the Kreisliga, scoring 94 goals in two seasons with the club. At PSV Bork his father was the coach and his brother was also a player.

After a potential transfer to Borussia Dortmund was ended due to medical problems, he turned professional with English club Bradford City in July 2017. He made his debut for the club on 19 March 2018, appearing as a substitute in a 2–0 league defeat away at Doncaster Rovers. During his year at Bradford City he suffered from back problems. 

He returned to Germany with Hammer SpVg in July 2018. After a season at Hammer SpVg, SC Preußen Münster announced on 27 June 2019 that they had signed Grodowski on a two-year contract. In summer 2021, he joined 3. Liga side SC Verl on a two-year contract.

Career statistics

References

1997 births
Living people
German footballers
Association football forwards
3. Liga players
English Football League players
FC Schalke 04 players
Rot Weiss Ahlen players
Bradford City A.F.C. players
Hammer SpVg players
SC Preußen Münster players
SC Verl players
German expatriate footballers
German expatriate sportspeople in England
Expatriate footballers in England